Sophia Derivan (born 9 June 2000) is an Irish junior tennis player.

On the juniors tour, Derivan has a career high ITF junior combined ranking of 354, achieved on 24 April 2017.

She started studying at University of Colorado, in 2019.

ITF junior finals

Singles (2–1)

Doubles (3–2)

National representation

Fed Cup
Derivan made her Fed Cup debut for Ireland in 2017, while the team was competing in the Europe/Africa Zone Group III, when she was 17 years and 4 days old.

Fed Cup (5–3)

Singles (1–1)

Doubles (4–2)

References

External links
 
 
 
 

2000 births
Living people
Irish female tennis players
Tennis players from Dublin (city)
Colorado Buffaloes women's tennis players